The 2009–10 season of the Bayernliga, the fifth tier of the German football league system in the state of Bavaria at the time, was the 65th season of the league.

Overview
The league champions, FC Memmingen, were directly promoted to the Regionalliga Süd. It was Memmingen's first-ever Bayernliga title, won after having played 43 seasons in the league.

The bottom four clubs were directly relegated from the league while 15th placed SpVgg Ansbach had to enter the relegation round with the Landesliga runners-up where it ultimately lost to 1. FC Schweinfurt 05 and was relegated. Of the relegated clubs only VfL Frohnlach made an immediate return to the Bayernliga in the following season while SV Memmelsdorf returned to the league in 2012 when it was expanded from one to two divisions. 1. FC Bad Kötzting and SpVgg Ansbach won promotion back to the Bayernliga in 2014 while TSG Thannhausen was unable to make a return.

Christian Doll of TSV Aindling was the league's top scorer with 21 goals.

Table
The 2009–10 season saw five new clubs in the league, TSV 1860 Rosenheim, SV Schalding-Heining and SV Memmelsdorf, all promoted from the Landesliga Bayern, while SpVgg Unterhaching II and TSV Großbardorf had been relegated from the Regionalliga Süd to the league.

For Schalding-Heining and Memmelsdorf it was their first-ever season in the league while Rosenheim had last played in the Bayernliga in 1998. The two clubs relegated to the league had both been promoted to the Regionalliga in 2008 during a league expansion but lasted for only one season at this level.

Bayernliga promotion round
The 15th placed Bayernliga team had to face the runners-up of the three Landesligas for one more place in the Bayernliga.

References

Sources

External links 
  of the Bavarian Football Association 

2009-10
5
2009–10 in European fifth tier association football leagues